Ilse Paulis (born 30 July 1993) is a Dutch representative rower. She is a world champion, a dual Olympian, an Olympic gold medallist and has set three world's best times, two of which are standing world records as of 2021. She is racing the lightweight women's double scull with Marieke Keijser at Tokyo 2021.

Club and college career
Paulis rowed collegiately for the Ohio State Buckeyes.

International representative career
Together with Maaike Head, she won the gold medal in the lightweight double sculls at the 2016 Summer Olympics.

World record holder
At the 2014 World Rowing Championships in Amsterdam, in the final of women's lightweight quad scull Paulis, Mirte Kraaijkamp, Elisabeth Woerner and Maaike Head rowed a world's best time of 6:15.95 a mark which has not been beaten as of 2021.

In 2016 at the World Rowing Cup III in Poznan, Paulis and Head set a new world's best time of 6:47.69 in a lightweight double scull. This record stood until June 2021 when Paulis, now rowing with Marieke Keijser clocked 6:43.79 in the final at WRC III in Sabaudia, Italy.

References

External links
 
 
 
 

1993 births
Living people
Dutch female rowers
Rowers at the 2016 Summer Olympics
Olympic rowers of the Netherlands
Olympic gold medalists for the Netherlands
Olympic medalists in rowing
World Rowing Championships medalists for the Netherlands
Medalists at the 2016 Summer Olympics
Knights of the Order of Orange-Nassau
Ohio State Buckeyes rowers
People from Leiderdorp
Rowers at the 2020 Summer Olympics
Medalists at the 2020 Summer Olympics
Olympic bronze medalists for the Netherlands
Sportspeople from South Holland
20th-century Dutch women
21st-century Dutch women